is a village located in Miyagi Prefecture, Japan. , the village had an estimated population of 5,918, and a population density of 98 persons per km2 in 2108 households.

Geography
Ōhira is located near the geographic centre of Miyagi Prefecture, north of Sendai.

Neighboring municipalities
Miyagi Prefecture
Ōsaki
Taiwa
Shikama
Ōsato

Climate
The village has a climate characterized by cool summers and long cold winters (Köppen climate classification Cfa).

Demographics
Per Japanese census data, the population of Ōhira has remained relatively stable over the past 70 years.

History
The area of present-day Ōhira was part of ancient Mutsu Province, and has been settled since at least the Jōmon period by the Emishi people. Per the Shoku Nihongi, following an earthquake in the year 715 AD, a large number of people migrated to this area from the southern Kantō region, forming numerous fortified settlements. During the Sengoku period, the area was contested by various samurai clans before the area came under the control of the Date clan of Sendai Domain during the Edo period, under the Tokugawa shogunate.

The village of Ōhira was created within Kurokawa District, Miyagi Prefecture after the Meiji restoration on April 1, 1889 with the establishment of the modern municipalities system.

Government
Ōhira has a mayor-council form of government with a directly elected mayor and a unicameral village of 11 members. Ōhira, together with the rest of Kurokawa District and the city of Tomiya collectively contributes two seats to the Miyagi Prefectural legislature. In terms of national politics, the village is part of Miyagi 4th district of the lower house of the Diet of Japan.

Economy
The economy of Ōhira is largely based on agriculture, primarily the cultivation of rice. Toyota opened a new assembly plant in Ōhira on February 17, 2011, its first new plant in Japan in 18 years. The plant, (belonging to Central Motors), employing 900 people, assembles the Toyota Yaris and Corolla for both the domestic market and North America, with a capacity of 120,000 vehicles a year.

Education
Ōhira has one public elementary school and one public junior high school operated by the village government. The village does not have a high school.

Transportation

Railway
Ōhira does not have any passenger railway service.

Highway
 - Ōhira IC

Local attractions
 Site of Ōhira Castle
 Ōhira Hachiman Jinja

References

External links

Official Website 

 
Villages in Miyagi Prefecture